Herpetogramma dilatatipes is a moth in the family Crambidae. It was described by Francis Walker in 1866. It is found in Australia and Indonesia (Sumbawa, Mysol, Tenimber).

References

Moths described in 1866
Herpetogramma
Moths of Australia
Moths of Indonesia